is a Japanese animator, character designer, and director. He is best known for his work on Sword Art Online, the anime series based on the light novel of the same name.

Biography 
Shingo Adachi was born in Osaka, Japan. He is an alumnus of Department of Visual Concept Planning, Osaka University of Arts. At first, he wanted to become a professional manga artist and joined a manga/anime research circle called 'CAS' while he was still in college. He then decided to start his career in the animation industry as in-house animator at Xebec after Mitsuru Ishihara who was his senior in college invited him to join the company. He is currently working as a freelancer animator. On December 31, 2021, it was announced that Adachi is making his directorial debut with the 2022 original television anime Lycoris Recoil at A-1 Pictures.

Works 
TV Series
 Rockman.EXE Beast+ (2006) – Character Design
 Mega Man Star Force (2006) – Character Design
 Mega Man Star Force Tribe (2007-2008) – Character Design
 Working!! (2010) – Character Design
 Working'!! (2011) – Character Design
 Sword Art Online (2012) – Character Design
 Galilei Donna (2013) – Character Design
 Sword Art Online II (2014) – Character Design
 Working!!! (2015) – Character Design
 Sword Art Online: Alicization (2018-2020) – Character Design
 Lycoris Recoil (2022) – Director

Films
 Sword Art Online The Movie: Ordinal Scale (2017) – Character Design
 Pompo: The Cinéphile (2021) – Character Design

ONA
 Minarai Diva (2014) – Character Design

Video games
 Loop8: Summer of Gods (2023) – Character Design

References

External links 

 

Anime character designers
Anime directors
Living people
Year of birth missing (living people)